In electromagnetics, proximity effect is a redistribution of electric current occurring in nearby parallel electrical conductors carrying alternating current flowing in the same direction which causes the current distribution in the conductor to concentrate on the side away from the nearby conductor.  It is caused by eddy currents induced by the time-varying magnetic field of the other conductor.  For example, in a coil of wire carrying alternating current with multiple turns of wire lying next to each other, the current in each wire will be concentrated in a strip on each side of the wire facing away from the adjacent wires.  This "current crowding" effect causes the current to occupy a smaller effective cross-sectional area of the conductor, increasing current density and AC electrical resistance of the conductor. The  concentration of current on the side of the conductor gets larger with increasing frequency.  Similarly, in adjacent conductors carrying AC flowing in opposite directions, the current will be redistributed to the side of the conductor closest to the other conductor.

Explanation 

A changing magnetic field will influence the distribution of an electric current flowing within an electrical conductor, by electromagnetic induction. When an alternating current (AC) flows through a conductor, it creates an associated alternating magnetic field around it. The alternating magnetic field induces eddy currents in adjacent conductors, altering the overall distribution of current flowing through them.  The result is that the current is concentrated in the areas of the conductor farthest away from nearby conductors carrying current in the same direction.

The proximity effect can significantly increase the AC resistance of adjacent conductors when compared to its resistance to a DC current.  The effect increases with frequency.   At higher frequencies, the AC resistance of a conductor can easily exceed ten times its DC resistance.

Example 

For example, if two wires carrying the same alternating current lie parallel to one another, as would be found in a coil used in an inductor or transformer, the magnetic field of one wire will induce longitudinal eddy currents in the adjacent wire, that flow in long loops along the wire, in the same direction as the main current on the side of the wire facing away from the other wire, and back in the opposite direction on the side of the wire facing the other wire.  Thus the eddy current will reinforce the main current on the side facing away from the first wire, and oppose the main current on the side facing the first wire.  The net effect is to redistribute the current in the cross section of the wire into a thin strip on the side facing away from the other wire.  Since the current is concentrated into a smaller area of the wire, the resistance is increased.

Similarly, in two adjacent conductors carrying alternating currents flowing in opposite directions, such as are found in power cables and pairs of bus bars, the current in each conductor is concentrated into a strip on the side facing the other conductor.

Effects 

The additional resistance increases power losses which, in power circuits, can generate undesirable heating. Proximity and skin effect significantly complicate the design of efficient transformers and inductors operating at high frequencies, used for example in switched-mode power supplies.

In radio frequency tuned circuits used in radio equipment, proximity and skin effect losses in the inductor reduce the Q factor, broadening the bandwidth.  To minimize this, special construction is used in radio frequency inductors.  The winding is usually limited to a single layer, and often the turns are spaced apart to separate the conductors.  In multilayer coils, the successive layers are wound in a crisscross pattern to avoid having wires lying parallel to one another; these are sometimes referred to as "basket-weave" or "honeycomb" coils.   Since the current flows on the surface of the conductor, high frequency coils are sometimes silver-plated, or made of litz wire.

Dowell method for determination of losses
This one-dimensional method for transformers assumes the wires have rectangular cross-section, but can be applied approximately to circular wire by treating it as square with the same cross-sectional area.

The windings are divided into 'portions', each portion being a group of layers which contains one position of zero MMF. For a transformer with a separate primary and secondary winding, each winding is a portion. For a transformer with interleaved (or sectionalised) windings, the innermost and outermost sections are each one portion, while the other sections are each divided into two portions at the point where zero m.m.f occurs.

The total resistance of a portion is given by

RDC is the DC resistance of the portion
Re(·) is the real part of the expression in brackets
m number of layers in the portion, this should be an integer

 Angular frequency of the current
 resistivity of the conductor material

Nl number of turns per layer
a width of a square conductor
b width of the winding window
h height of a square conductor

Squared-field-derivative method
This can be used for round wire or litz wire transformers or inductors with multiple windings of arbitrary geometry with arbitrary current waveforms in each winding. The diameter of each strand should be less than 2 δ. It also assumes the magnetic field is perpendicular to the axis of the wire, which is the case in most designs.

 Find values of the B field due to each winding individually. This can be done using a simple magnetostatic FEA model where each winding is represented as a region of constant current density, ignoring individual turns and litz strands.
 Produce a matrix, D, from these fields.  D is a function of the geometry and is independent of the current waveforms. 
 is the field due to a unit current in winding j
 is the spatial average over the region of winding j

 is the number of turns in winding j, for litz wire this is the product of the number of turns and the strands per turn.
 is the average length of a turn
 is the wire or strand diameter
 is the resistivity of the wire
 AC power loss in all windings can be found using D, and expressions for the instantaneous current in each winding: 
 Total winding power loss is then found by combining this value with the DC loss,  

The method can be generalized to multiple windings.

See also
Skin effect

External links
Skin Effect, Proximity Effect, and Litz Wire Electromagnetic effects
Skin and Proximity Effects and HiFi Cables

References
Terman, F.E. Radio Engineers' Handbook, McGraw-Hill 1943—details electromagnetic proximity and skin effects

Electrical engineering